Miletus chinensis longeana, or Long's brownie, is a small but striking subspecies of butterfly found in India and Myanmar that belongs to the lycaenids or blues family.

Range
It ranges from Manipur in India to Myanmar.

Status
This subspecies is reported as not being rare by William Harry Evans and as rare as per Mark Alexander Wynter-Blyth.

Description
A small butterfly, 30 to 38 mm in wingspan. The upper forewing in both sexes has a prominent curved white discal band; the lower spots composing it are separate and sometimes coalesced in female. The apical area of the upper forewing is darker than the basal area. The dry-season form of the butterfly is white above except for the apex and a discal brown patch of the forewing and the costa on the hindwing.

Taxonomy
The butterfly was earlier known as Gerydus longeana de Nicéville. It was formerly treated as a species, but is now regarded as a subspecies of Miletus chinensis.

Cited references

References
Print

Online

Miletus (butterfly)
Butterflies of Asia
Butterfly subspecies